True Reflections is a rock album by American musician Boyd Tinsley released in June 2003. Though best known as a violinist with The Dave Matthews Band, the album focuses on his singing. He was the first member of the group to release a solo album.

The album was not well received by critics, who largely ignored it, and sales were modest. A retrospective review of True Reflections for Allmusic was a positive 4 stars out of 5, describing the album as "making the best of his dusky, unpretentious voice" with the only shortcoming being the persistently melancholy mood of the songs.

Track listing
 "It's Alright" – 4:59
 "Show Me" – 4:28
 "So Glad" – 3:59
 "Listen" – 4:13
 "Cause It's Time" – 3:34
 "Long Time to Wait" – 5:33
 "Perfect World" – 2:52
 "Cinnamon Girl" (Neil Young) – 3:12
 "Run" – 5:27
 "What a Time For Love" – 3:54
 "True Reflections" featuring Dave Matthews – 5:34

References

2003 albums
Dave Matthews Band
RCA Records albums